Hussain Mustahil Rabia (born 2 May 1980), commonly known as Hussain Mustahil, is an Omani footballer who plays for Al-Nasr S.C.S.C.

International career
Hussain was part of the first team squad of the Oman national football team till 2006. He was selected for the national team for the first time in 2001. He has made appearances in the 2002 FIFA World Cup qualification, the 2006 FIFA World Cup qualification and the 2007 AFC Asian Cup qualification and has represented the national team in the 2007 AFC Asian Cup.

Club career statistics

References

External links
 
 
 

1980 births
Living people
People from Salalah
Omani footballers
Oman international footballers
Omani expatriate footballers
2004 AFC Asian Cup players
Al-Nasr SC (Salalah) players
Khaitan SC players
Al-Nasr SC (Kuwait) players
Expatriate footballers in Kuwait
Omani expatriate sportspeople in Kuwait
Footballers at the 2002 Asian Games
Association football defenders
Asian Games competitors for Oman
Al-Sahel SC (Kuwait) players
Kuwait Premier League players